Eupithecia gradatilinea is a moth in the  family Geometridae. It is found in Equatorial Guinea (Bioko), Kenya, Malawi, South Africa, Zambia and Zimbabwe.

The larvae feed on Acacia xanthophloea.

References

Moths described in 1916
gradatilinea
Moths of Africa